Zionides are piyyutim which express the longing of the Jewish nation to see the hill of Zion and the city of Jerusalem shine again in all their former glory. They date back to the time immediately after the destruction of Solomon's Temple. Since that period the poets and singers of Israel have devoted their best talent to painting in the most brilliant colors the ancient glories of Zion. 

By far the greater number of these songs unite in voicing a heartfelt desire to see the nation, the city of Jerusalem, Mount Zion, and the Temple restored to their former splendor.

Biblical songs 
The oldest song of Zion in Jewish literature was written around the fifth century BCE, and is a lamentation that the enemy compels Israel to live on foreign soil; this is the celebrated Psalm 137:1-3. A similar Zionide of the same period is Psalm 86; in it the poet, full of hope, sings of the day when the Captivity shall be over and the joyfully returning exiles shall sing a new song of Zion. The fifth chapter of Lamentations is an elegy ending with a desire for deliverance.

Middle Ages 

During the Middle Ages, Zionides from the pens of the greatest poets formed the chief comfort and consolation of the people. As early as the time of Ibn Gabirol (11th century) songs of Zion were incorporated in the liturgy, partly as lamentations for Tisha B'Av and partly as tefillot and piyyutim. Notable lamentations for Zion which are sung on Tisha B'Av include: a song beginning with the words  and giving a vivid description of the destruction of Zion; the well-known song which begins with the words , and in which Samaria and Jerusalem try to excel each other in the description of the misfortune which has fallen upon them; and, above all, the Eli Tzion with its refrain:
Zion and her cities wail like a woman in childbirth, and like a virgin clothed in sackcloth for the man of her youthful choice.

Also notable are several strophes of the song "Lekhah Dodi", which is sung in the Sabbath eve service.

The most important of Ibn Gabirol's Zionides are the poem beginning with the words:

Send a prince to the condemned people which is scattered hither and thither
and that beginning:

Turn thy face, O God, to the conquered, who is delivered up into the hand of Babel and of Seir.

Judah ha-Levi (1140) was the author of the Zionide beginning:

Zion, wilt thou not send a greeting to thy captives, Who greet thee as the remnant of thy flocks? From West to East, from North to South, a greeting, From far and near, take thou on all sides. A greeting sends the captive of desire, who sheds his tears Like dew on Hermon; would they might fall on thy hills.

Besides this song, which has been translated into nearly all European languages in prose and in verse, Judah wrote several shorter songs, chief of which are ("My heart is in the East, although I am at the end of the West") and 
Sigh, O Jerusalem; and shed thy tears, O Zion.

Various authors 

Among other medieval writers of this class may be mentioned Abraham ibn Ezra, who composed the Zionide ("O God, who art enthroned in the East, appease the mourning dove"); Judah al-Ḥarizi (13th century), author of the song ("Peace be to the city of Salem Jerusalem"); and Israel Najara (16th century), who wrote the song ("May the flower of salvation bloom like a palm"). 

In more modern times Samuel David Luzzatto wrote:

("My heart, my heart is full of pain; see, my grief is an ancient one"); 

Equally well known is Joseph Almanzi's

("From all corners comes rejoicing on the day of celebration to God, who is good").

The most prominent Hebrew poets have written Zionides, among the number being M. S. Rabener, Micah Levisohn, Judah Loeb Gordon, S. Mandelkern, M. M. Dolitzky, and N. H. Imber. 
Countless songs have been produced under the influence of Zionism: of these may be mentioned the song adopted by all the Zionists of the world as their national song, and beginning with the words "There, where a slender cedar kisses the clouds"; the song of the academic society Kadimah in Austria, "Knowest thou whence freedom comes"?; 
the song of the united Zionists, "Sluchajcie bracia gueśni tij"; and "Hatikva" (Hope), composed by N. H. Imber, which has the refrain:

("Our hope has not yet gone, the old hope to return to the land of our fathers, to the city where David lived").

Bibliography 

 Kinnor Tziyyon, Warsaw, 1900 (collection of all the Zionides from the oldest times to the present day [Hebr.])
 Yevreiskyie Motivy, Grodno, 1900
 Heinrich Loewe, Liederbuch für Jüdische Vereine, Cologne, 1898
 Jacobs, Jewish Ideals, p. 131

References 

Jewish liturgical poems
Hebrew language
Zionism